Winn is a surname. Notable people with the name include:

 A. M. Winn (1810–1883), American politician
 Alan Winn (born 1996), American soccer player
 Alexander Winn (born 1986), American machinima filmmaker
 Anona Winn (1904-1994), Australian-born actress
 Ashley Winn (born 1985), American footballer
 Billy Winn (1909–1938), American racing driver
 Billy Winn (American football) (born 1989), American football player
 Bruce Winn (1959-2012), American ceramist
 Chris Winn (1926–2017), English rugby union player and cricketer
 Cole Winn (born 1999), American baseball player
 Coralie Winn, Australian-born New Zealand urban arts director
 Courtland Winn (1863–1940) American politician, lawyer, and civic leader
 Craig Winn, American author and businessman
 Daniel K. Winn (born 1966), Vietnamese-American artist, curator, and philanthropist
 Daniel P Winn (born 1981), American musician and Artist,United states  Intelligence Contractor
 David Winn (born 1966), American animator and writer
 David W. Winn (1923–1990), United States Air Force general
 Deron Winn (born 1989), American mixed martial artist and freestyle wrestler
 Edward Winn (1937–1995), American third-party presidential candidate
 George Winn (1897–1969), American baseball player
 George Winn (American football) (born 1990), American football player
 Godfrey Winn (1906–1971), British journalist, writer and actor
 Grover C. Winn (1886–1943), American lawyer and politician
 H. Richard Winn, American neurosurgeon 
 Haley Winn (born 2003), American ice hockey player
 Jack Winn (1898–1974), American football player
 Jane Frances Winn (1855–1927), American journalist
 Jean Winn, English table tennis player
 Jim Winn (born 1959), American baseball pitcher
 John Winn (1921–2015), British soldier
 Julian Winn (born 1972), Welsh cyclist
 Kitty Winn (born 1944), American theatre and film actress
 Larry Winn (1919–2017), American politician
 Marcus Winn (born 1982), American football defensive back
 Marie Winn (born 1936), American journalist, author and bird-watcher
 Masyn Winn (born 2002), American baseball player
 Matt Winn (1861–1949), American horse racing personality
 Norman Winn (1900–1972), English footballer
 Paul Winn, Canadian human rights activist and lawyer
 Peter Winn, American historian
 Peter Winn (footballer) (born 1988), English footballer
 Philip D. Winn (1925–2017), American politician and diplomat
 Randy Winn (born 1974), American baseball outfielder
 Raynor Winn, British writer
 Red Winn (born 1896), American poker player
 Richard Winn (1750–1818), American merchant, surveyor, and politician from South Carolina
 Robert W. Winn (1895–1948), American politician from Missouri
 Rodger Winn (1903–1972), British judge
 Ross Winn (1871–1912), American anarchist writer and publisher
 Rowland Winn (disambiguation), several people
 Ryan Winn (born 1976), American comic book artist
 Sabine Winn (1734–1798), Swiss textile artist
 Sherry Winn (born 1961), American handball player
 Steve Winn (born 1981), Welsh rugby union player
 Steve Winn (footballer) (born 1959), English footballer
 Ted Winn, American singer
 Tim Winn (born 1977), American basketball player
 Thomas E. Winn (1839–1925), American politician
 Valdenia Winn (born 1950), American politician
 Vincent Winn (born 1966), English cricketer
 William Winn (1945–2006), American educational psychologist and professor

See also 
 Wynn (surname)